Alan McLucas  is an Australian Paralympian. At the 1964 Tokyo Games, he won a bronze medal in the table tennis men's singles A2 event. At the 1968 Tel Aviv Games, he won a gold medal in the men's slalom cervical class event and a silver medal in archery in the men's St. Nicholas round cervical event, and participated in table tennis. He also participated in swimming at both the 1964 and 1968 Paralympics.

References

Year of birth missing (living people)
Australian male archers
Australian male swimmers
Australian male table tennis players
Australian male wheelchair racers
Archers at the 1968 Summer Paralympics
Paralympic archers of Australia
Athletes (track and field) at the 1968 Summer Paralympics
Paralympic athletes of Australia
Swimmers at the 1964 Summer Paralympics
Swimmers at the 1968 Summer Paralympics
Male Paralympic swimmers of Australia
Table tennis players at the 1964 Summer Paralympics
Table tennis players at the 1968 Summer Paralympics
Paralympic table tennis players of Australia
Medalists at the 1964 Summer Paralympics
Medalists at the 1968 Summer Paralympics
Paralympic medalists in archery
Paralympic medalists in athletics (track and field)
Paralympic medalists in swimming
Paralympic medalists in table tennis
Paralympic gold medalists for Australia
Paralympic silver medalists for Australia
Paralympic bronze medalists for Australia
Wheelchair category Paralympic competitors
Living people
20th-century Australian people